Castel di Iudica (Sicilian: Castel di Jùdica) is a comune (municipality) in the Metropolitan City of Catania in the Italian region Sicily, located about  southeast of Palermo and about  west of Catania.

Castel di Judica borders the following municipalities: Agira, Catenanuova, Centuripe, Paternò, Ramacca.

References

Cities and towns in Sicily